Sean is a given name.
List of people named Sean, list of people with the given name

Sean may also refer to:

Sean (cartoonist) (1935–2005), American artist
Sean (Street Fighter), character from the Street Fighter series

See also
Shawn (disambiguation)
Shon (disambiguation)